Yaroslav Martynyuk (born 20 February 1989) is a Ukrainian professional football midfielder who played for Metalist 1925 Kharkiv.

Career
He is the product of the Karpaty Lviv Youth School System.

References

External links 
Website Karpaty Profile
Profile on Football Squads

 

1989 births
Living people
Footballers from Vinnytsia
Ukrainian footballers
Association football midfielders
FC Karpaty Lviv players
FC Karpaty-2 Lviv players
FC Arsenal Kyiv players
FC Shakhtyor Soligorsk players
FC AGMK players
Ermis Aradippou FC players
FC Rukh Lviv players
FC Metalist 1925 Kharkiv players
Ukrainian Premier League players
Ukrainian First League players
Ukrainian Second League players
Belarusian Premier League players
Uzbekistan Super League players
Cypriot First Division players
Ukrainian expatriate footballers
Expatriate footballers in Belarus
Expatriate footballers in Uzbekistan
Expatriate footballers in Cyprus
Ukrainian expatriate sportspeople in Belarus
Ukrainian expatriate sportspeople in Uzbekistan
Ukrainian expatriate sportspeople in Cyprus
Ukraine youth international footballers